Brignano Gera d'Adda is a comune (municipality) in the Province of Bergamo in the Italian region of Lombardy, located about  east of Milan and about  south of Bergamo.

Main sights
The main attraction is the Palazzo Visconti, divided into a Palazzo Vecchio ("Old Palace") and a Palazzo Nuovo ("New Palace"). Originally a defensive castle known from the 10th century, it was rebuilt in the 13th to 17th centuries; it houses frescoes from the Galliari brothers, Mattia Bortoloni and  Alessandro Magnasco.

The church of Sant'Andrea dates to the 11th century. It has a 15th-century entrance portico.

References

External links
 Official website